Incilius is genus of toads in the true toad family, Bufonidae. They are sometimes known as the Central American toads or  Middle American toads and are found in southern USA, Mexico, Central America, and northern Pacific South America (Colombia and Ecuador). They are an ecologically and biogeographically diverse group of toads, including micro-endemic species such as Incilius spiculatus that are restricted to undisturbed cloud forests, and widespread lowland species such as Incilius valliceps that predominantly occur in disturbed habitats.

Taxonomy and systematics
This genus was first described in 1863 by Edward Drinker Cope who designated the type species as Incilius coniferus. This proved unpopular and these toads were known under the genus Bufo until the early 2000s. 

The current delineation of the genus follows Mendelson et al. (2011) who brought Cranopsis/Cranophryne/Ollotis and Crepidius/Crepidophryne into synonymy with Incilius, while providing evidence for removing Rhinella from Incilius. Taxonomy and systematics of the toads now considered to be classified in this genus had seen many changes after Incilius was resurrected to split Bufo in the less than a decade before this 2011 paper. I. coniferus went through some five name changes in less than a dozen years. However, the monophyly of Incilius continues to be threatened by Incilius bocourti, which might be the sister taxon of Anaxyrus.

Another discussion has been the taxonomic level at which the genus is recognized. Incilius did not see wide recognition before the large-scale revision of amphibian systematics by Darrel Frost and colleagues in 2006, then under the name Cranopsis, including the former "Bufo valliceps group" and some related species. However, others have argued that Incilius should be treated as a subgenus of Bufo.

Species
There are at present 39 species:

The AmphibiaWeb recognizes Incilius intermedius (Günther, 1858) as a valid species, whereas the Amphibian Species of the World considers it a synonym of Incilius occidentalis (Camerano, 1879).

References

 
Amphibian genera
Amphibians of North America
Amphibians of Central America
Amphibians of South America
Taxa named by Edward Drinker Cope